Cain and Abel (Italian: Caino e Abele), also known as The Murder of Abel, and The Death of Abel, is an oil painting by the Venetian painter Tintoretto, made around 1550–1553, and kept in the Gallerie dell'Accademia in Venice.

Subject 

The scene in question is the first murder recounted in the Genesis narrative. Cain and Abel were two brothers, the first sons of Adam and Eve. Cain, the firstborn, was a farmer, and Abel was a shepherd. The brothers made sacrifices to God, but God accepted the firstlings offered by Abel rather than the first fruits offered by Cain. Cain, full of jealousy, called out Abel into the fields, and slew him.

History 
For the Scuola della Trinità, Tintoretto painted four or five pictures depicting subjects taken from the Book of Genesis, having reference to the biblical creation of the world; of which two are preserved untouched, and now hang on either side of Titian's Assumption in the Academy at Venice. These are The Death of Abel and Adam and Eve, of which William Roscoe Osler writes:John Ruskin expresses his admiration in terms of enthusiasm:

Analysis 

The depiction of Cain killing Abel has been admired for its energy and violence, as Evelyn March Phillipps observes:

References

Sources 

 Holborn, J. B. Stroughton (1907). Jacopo Robusti, Called Tintoretto. Williamson, G. C. (ed.). The Great Masters in Painting and Sculpture. London: George Bell & Sons. pp. 13, 14, 31, 32, 125.
 Krischel, Roland (2000). Meister der italienischen Kunst. Tintoretto [Jacopo Tintoretto, 1519–1594]. Translated by Bell, Anthea. Germany: Könemann Verlagsgesellschaft. p. 41.
 Newton, Eric (1972). Tintoretto. Westport, CT: Greenwood Press. pp. 46, 48, 78.
 Osler, W. Roscoe (1892). Tintoretto. Illustrated Biographies of the Great Artists. London: Sampson Low, Marston, Searle, & Rivington. pp. 24, 93.
 Phillipps, Evelyn March (1911). Tintoretto. London: Methuen & Co. Ltd. p. 45.
 Ruskin, John (1877). Guide to the Principal Pictures in the Academy of Fine Arts at Venice. London and Aylesbury: Hazell, Watson, and Viney. p. 10.
 Stearns, Frank Preston (1894). Life and Genius of Jacopo Robusti, Called Tintoretto. New York and London: G. P. Putnam's Sons. pp. 61, 82, 109, 110, 153, 319.
 "Cain and Abel". Gallerie dell'Accademia di Venezia. 2020. Retrieved 8 August 2022.

1550s paintings
Paintings by Tintoretto
Paintings depicting Cain and Abel